Cordwalles is a private, boarding preparatory school for boys founded in 1912. It is located in Pietermaritzburg, the capital city of KwaZulu-Natal, South Africa.

Origins 

Cordwalles was founded in 1912 by the Rt Revd Samuel Baines, Bishop of Natal as a preparatory school for Michaelhouse. It has grown considerably since its early beginnings as a boarding-only school and has had only seven headmasters. Cordwalles has an Anglican foundation.

Headmasters 

 J. H. E. Besant, MA (Oxon) (1912 – 1946)
 J. D. Parmiter, MA (Cantab) (1947 – 1956)
 R. C. Brooks, MA (Cantab) (1957 – 1984)
 D. B. E Bawden (1985 – 1995)
 T. G. Evans (1996 – 2003)
 Simon Weaver (2004 – 2015)
 Lance Veenstra (2016 – present)

The school today

Cordwalles is a boys preparatory school, which educates boys from Grade RR (boys turning 5) to Grade 7 (boys turning 13).

Cordwalles consists of fifteen hectares of ground, an 'Inky' (pre-school to grade 2) block and Lecture Room, Theatre, Science Laboratory, Design & Technology Centre and Computer and Media Centres.

There are over 300 boys taught by an academic and support staff of over 50. Most leavers go on to attend local private senior schools such as Hilton College, Kearsney College, Maritzburg College, St. Charles College and especially Michaelhouse.

History

Cordwalles Preparatory School was founded by Bishop Samuel Baines in 1912 when Michaelhouse moved from Pietermaritzburg to Balgowan and needing a preparatory school of its own to ensure its future enrolment.

By 1917 the school encompassed  of land, classrooms and dormitories. In the 1930s the Chapel, Gymnasium, Swimming Pool as well as additional classrooms, dormitories and land were added. During the Second World War numbers rose to one hundred and forty seven boys. From the 1950s further dormitories together with a Kitchen block, Sanatorium, and enlarged Dining Hall, Science Laboratory, Library and Staff Houses were constructed. The 1960s saw the development of the double storey block, the five sports fields and the four tennis courts.

Notable alumni
Professor David H.M.Brooks (1961), philosopher and author of The Unity of the Mind
Gary Ralfe, Managing Director of De Beers
Robert Holmes à Court, Australia's first billionaire
Barry Streek, journalist
Wilbur Smith (1946), novelist
Derek Varnals, cricketer
Timothy Woods, schoolmaster

External links

ISASA Schools Directory

Anglican schools in South Africa
Boarding schools in South Africa
Primary schools in South Africa
Private schools in KwaZulu-Natal
Educational institutions established in 1912
1912 establishments in South Africa